Jo Oldson (born May 15, 1956) is the Iowa State Representative from the 41st District. A Democrat, she has served in the Iowa House of Representatives since 2003.  Oldson was born and raised in Eagle Grove, Iowa and resides in Des Moines. She received her BA and JD from Drake University.

, Oldson serves on several committees in the Iowa House – the Commerce and Judiciary committees. She also serves as the ranking member of the Ways and Means committee.

Oldson first won election in 2002, following the 2002 redistricting, winning a three-way primary and defeating incumbent Republican Betty Grundberg from the old 73rd District.

Electoral history
*incumbent

References

External links

 Representative Jo Oldson official Iowa General Assembly site
 Jo Oldson State Representative official constituency site
 
 Financial information (state office) at the National Institute for Money in State Politics

1956 births
Living people
People from Eagle Grove, Iowa
Democratic Party members of the Iowa House of Representatives
Women state legislators in Iowa
Drake University alumni
Politicians from Des Moines, Iowa
21st-century American politicians
21st-century American women politicians
Drake University Law School alumni